The Portuguese Handball Cup (Portuguese: Taça de Portugal de Andebol) is a handball competition played in the Swiss system and eligible for all professional and amateur teams in Portugal.

The most successful club in the competition is Sporting CP with 16 trophies. They are they current title holders, after defeating FC Porto in the final 2022.

Winners

Taça Nacional de Andebol Português  Portuguese National Handball Cup 

1971–72: Sporting CP
1972–73: Sporting CP (2)
1973–74: Belenenses
1974–75: Sporting CP (3)
1975–76: FC Porto
1976–77: FC Porto (2)
1977–78: Belenenses (2)
1978–79: FC Porto (3)
1979–80: FC Porto (4)
1980–81: Sporting CP (4)
1981–82: Belenenses (3)
1982–83: Sporting CP (5)
1983–84: Belenenses (4)
1984–85: Benfica
1985–86: Benfica (2)
1986–87: Benfica (3)
1987–88: Sporting CP (6)
1988–89: Sporting CP (7)
1989–90: ABC
1990–91: ABC (2)
1991–92: ABC (3)
1992–93: ABC (4)
1993–94: FC Porto (5)
1994–95: ABC (5)
1995–96: ABC (6)
1996–97: ABC (7)
1997–98: Sporting CP (8)
1998–99: Madeira SAD
1999–2000: ABC (8)
2000–01: Sporting CP (9)
2001–02: Águas Santas
2002–03: Sporting CP (10)
2003–04: Sporting CP (11)
2004–05: Sporting CP (12)
2005–06: FC Porto (6)
2006–07: FC Porto (7)
2007–08: ABC Braga (9)
2008–09: ABC Braga (10)

Taça de Portugal  Portuguese Handball Cup

Titles by club

See also 

Men's

 Andebol 1 
 Second Division 
 Third Division

 Supertaça
  Youth Honors

Women's
 First Division
 Taça de Portugal
 Supertaça
  Youth Honors (Women)

References

Cup
1971 establishments in Portugal